Total Intelligence Solutions, LLC, (TIS) is a risk management and consulting company headquartered in Arlington, Virginia.  The company delivers threat and vulnerability assessments, data acquisition capabilities, physical and information security services, training, and high-level consulting to Fortune 500 companies, and to U.S. and foreign governments.

TIS owned and operated the Terrorism Research Center, Incorporated (TRC) from 2007 to 2010. The TRC delivered training and research support relating to counterterrorism and asymmetric warfare/conflict to the private sector, and U.S. and foreign government customers.

TIS was owned by The Prince Group, a private company led by Erik Prince. Erik Prince also owned numerous other investment and business interests to include Academi (formerly known as Blackwater). Cofer Black was formerly the chairman of TIS.  The TIS website now forwards to a site operated by OODA Group LLC.

References

External links
 http://www.totalintel.com/index.php
 Total Intelligence Solutions at SourceWatch
 Dana Hedgpeth, "Blackwater's Owner Has Spies for Hire", Washington Post, Nov. 3, 2007, p.A01.
 http://www.ooda.com

Security companies of the United States
Risk management companies